Richard Arthur Wollheim (5 May 1923 − 4 November 2003) was a British philosopher noted for original work on mind and emotions, especially as related to the visual arts, specifically, painting.  Wollheim served as the president of the British Society of Aesthetics from 1992 onwards until his death in 2003.

Biography
Richard Wollheim was the son of Eric Wollheim, a theatre impresario, and Constance (Connie) Mary Baker, an actress who used the stage name Constance Luttrell. He attended Westminster School, London, and Balliol College, Oxford (1941–2, 1945–8), interrupted by active military service in World War II. In 1949 he obtained a congratulatory first in Philosophy, Politics and Economics, and began teaching at University College London, where he became Grote Professor of Mind and Logic and Department Head from 1963 to 1982. He retired from that position to take up professorships, first, at Columbia University (1982–85) and then the University of California at Berkeley (1985–2002). He chaired the Department at UC Berkeley, 1998–2002. On retirement from Berkeley, he served briefly as a guest lecturer at Balliol College. Additionally, he held visiting positions at Harvard University, the University of Minnesota, Graduate Center, CUNY, the University of California at Davis, and elsewhere. Wollheim gave several distinguished lecture series, most notably the Andrew M. Mellon lectures in Fine Arts, National Gallery of Art, Washington, D.C. (1984), published as Painting as an Art.

In 1962, he published an article "A paradox in the theory of democracy", in which Wollheim argued that a supporter of democracy faces a contradiction when he votes. On the one hand he wants a particular party or candidate to win, but on the other hand he wants whoever wins the most votes to win. This has become known as Wollheim's paradox.

His Art and its Objects was one of the twentieth century's most influential texts on philosophical aesthetics in English. In a 1965 essay, 'Minimal Art', he seems to have coined the phrase, although its meaning eventually drifted from his. As well as for his work on the philosophy of art, Wollheim was known for his philosophical treatments of depth psychology, especially Sigmund Freud's. His posthumously-published autobiography of youth, Germs: A Memoir of Childhood, with complementary essays, discloses a good deal about his family background and his life up to early manhood, providing valuable material for understanding his interests and sensibility.

Personal life
Wollheim married Anne Barbara Denise (1920-2004), daughter of Lieutenant-Colonel George Powell, of the Grenadier Guards, after her divorce from her first husband, the literary critic Philip Toynbee. They had twin sons, Bruno and Rupert.  Their marriage was dissolved in 1967. Wollheim married Mary Day Lanier in 1969; their daughter is Emilia.

Publications
For an extensive bibliography of Richard Wollheim's publications by a professional bibliographer, see Eddie Yeghiayan's UC-Irvine site. See also the 'Philweb' listing.

Note: given his unique mind, personality, and distinctive writing styles, along with his curiosity and sociability, many of Richard Wollheim's publications are outside academic categories. Besides books, he published many articles, in journals and edited collections, book reviews, and gallery catalogues for shows. He also left writings in manuscript, letters and recordings of his talks.

Books and separately published works (selected)
F. H. Bradley. Harmondsworth; Baltimore: Penguin, 1959. 2d edition, 1969.
'Socialism and Culture'. (Fabian Tract, 331.) London: Fabian Society, 1961.
'On Drawing an Object'.  London: University College, 1965 (long essay).  Repr. in On Art and the Mind.
Art and Its Objects: an Introduction to Aesthetics.  New York: Harper & Row, 1968.  Harmondsworth: Penguin Books, 1970. As Harper Torchbook, 1971.
Art and its Objects: With Six Supplementary Essays. 2d edition. Cambridge, New York: Cambridge University Press, 1980.
A Family Romance. London: Jonathan Cape, 1969.  New York: Farrar, Straus, Giroux, 1969 (novel).
Freud. (Fontana Modern Masters.) London: Collins, 1971. Paperback, 1973. American and later Cambridge University Press (1981) eds. titled Sigmund Freud.
On Art and the Mind: essays and lectures.  Cambridge, Massachusetts: Harvard University Press,1972.
'The Good Self and the Bad Self: the Moral Psychology of British Idealism and the English School of Psychoanalysis Compared' (1975)—repr. in The Mind and Its Depths, 1993.
'The Sheep and the Ceremony' (1976)—repr. in The Mind and Its Depths, 1983.
The Thread of Life. Cambridge, Massachusetts: Harvard University Press, 1984.
Painting as an Art. Andrew M. Mellon Lectures in Fine Arts, National Gallery of Art, Washington, D.C. Cambridge, Massachusetts: Harvard University Press, 1987.
The Mind and Its Depths. Cambridge, Massachusetts: Harvard University Press, 1993 (essays).
On the Emotions. New Haven and London: Yale University Press, 1999.
Germs: a memoir of childhood. London: Waywiser Press, 2004.

Edited books
The Image in Form: Selected Writings of Adrian Stokes (1974)
Freud: A Collection of Critical Essays (1974)
Philosophical Essays on Freud, with James Hopkins.  Cambridge: Cambridge University Press, 1982.
R.B.Kitaj : A Retrospective, with Richard Morphet.  London: Tate Publishing, 1994.

Selected articles
"Minimal Art", Arts Magazine (January 1965): 26–32. Repr. in On Art and the Mind.
"Nelson Goodman's Languages of Art", The Journal of Philosophy: 62, no. 16 (Ag. 1970): 531.
"Adrian Stokes, critic, painter, poet", Times Literary Supplement (17 February 1978): 207–209.
"The Cabinet of Dr Lacan", Topoi: 10 no. 2 (1991): 163–174. 
"A Bed out of Leaves", London Review of Books 25, no. 23 (4 December 2003).

Notes

External links
 The Guardian's obituary, Arthur Danto 
 ''The Daily Telegraph'''s obituary (Archived by Wayback Machine)
 ''The San Francisco Chronicle'''s obituary 
 ''The New York Times'''s obituary
   UCL obituary – PDF format
   Bruce Vermazen, Richard Wollheim Remembered 

1923 births
2003 deaths
20th-century British non-fiction writers
20th-century British philosophers
Academics of University College London
Alumni of Balliol College, Oxford
Analytic philosophers
Aristotelian philosophers
British essayists
British Jews
British male non-fiction writers
Columbia University faculty
Epistemologists
Harvard University staff
Jewish philosophers
Metaphysicians
Moral psychology
Ontologists
People educated at Westminster School, London
Philosophers of art
Philosophers of culture
Philosophers of education
Philosophers of mind
Philosophers of psychology
Political philosophers
Presidents of the American Philosophical Association
Presidents of the Aristotelian Society
British social commentators
Social philosophers
University of California, Berkeley faculty
Voting theorists
British military personnel of World War II